Anchomenus quadratus is a species of beetle in the family Carabidae. It is found in British Columbia, Canada and the U.S. states such as California, Oregon, and Washington.

References

Further reading

Harpalinae
Beetles described in 1854
Beetles of North America
Taxa named by John Lawrence LeConte